Thumal the Qahraman (died 929) was a Muslim woman appointed in 918 as a judge in a maẓālim (secular administrative) court during the reign of Caliph al-Muqtadir (r. 908–932). She was not a Qadi (a judge adjudicating Islamic law), for she only dealt with secular law. She was put in charge of rescripting the petitions which petitioners brought to the court. Her position was an extraordinary unique for her sex. She was appointed by Umm Jafar Muqtadir, the mother to caliph Jafar al-Muqtadir-billah (r. 908–923), the eighteenth Abbasid caliph.

Life 
Thumal was originally the qahramāna-assistant of Shaghab, mother of Caliph al-Muqtadir. 

When Shaghab secured the succession of her son to the throne, she de facto seized power and appointed a parallel bureaucracy to handle state affairs. Shaghab stated that the affairs of the ummah, especially justice, was better administered with a woman in charge. In 918 she appointed Thumal in charge of mazalim, in effect minister of justice or chief administrator of justice, and supervisor of the qadis. The qadis opposed to be supervised by a woman, but was forced to accept the appointment. 

According to the historian Tabari, Thumal carried out her duties well enough to achieve popularity among the public in her office, especially because of the new reforms which lower the cost for a plaintiff to initiate a case. However, her appointment was described in Muslim history, among others by Ibn Hazm, as one example of a series of "scandals whose equal has not been seen to this day".

See also
Women in islam
Qadi

References  

Fatema Mernissi, Mernissi, Fatima, and Mary Jo. Lakeland. The Forgotten Queens of Islam. Minneapolis: University of Minnesota, 1993. 42–43. Print. 
 Ibn Kathir, Al Bidayah wa al-Nihayah

Women judges
Sharia judges
Women's rights in Islam
People from Baghdad
9th-century births
Year of birth unknown
929 deaths
10th-century women from the Abbasid Caliphate
Women legal scholars
Officials of the Abbasid Caliphate
Medieval slaves
Arabian slaves and freedmen
Slaves from the Abbasid Caliphate
Courtiers of the Abbasid Caliphate
Abbasid harem
House slaves